E-Side 2 is the second English-language extended play (EP) and fourth overall by Japanese duo Yoasobi. It was released on November 18, 2022, through Sony Music Entertainment Japan. The EP consists of eight tracks from the duo's songs in the English language which are not included in their first English-language EP E-Side, preceded by two singles–"The Swallow", and "The Blessing"–released in the same month.

Background and release

Yoasobi released their first English-language EP, titled E-Side, on November 12, 2021, containing eight tracks original in Japanese translated to English, preceded by four singles–"Into the Night" ("Yoru ni Kakeru"), "RGB" ("Sangenshoku"), "Monster" ("Kaibutsu"), and "Blue" ("Gunjō"). The EP peaked at number 19 on the Oricon Combined Albums Chart, and number nine on the Billboard Japan Hot Albums, earned 9,100 downloads as of January 2022.

On November 4, 2022, Yoasobi released the English version of Hirogare! Irotoridoris theme "Tsubame", titled "The Swallow". Five days later, "The Blessing", an English version of the Mobile Suit Gundam: The Witch from Mercury opening theme "Shukufuku", was issued. It was included on the CD single version of "Shukufuku". On the same day, the duo announced the second English-language EP, titled E-Side 2, scheduled for release on November 18 to digital music and streaming platforms, the same date as "Umi no Manimani", the third single from the duo's novel collection project Hajimete no. The snippet video called "crossfade movie" was revealed two days before the release.

Commercial performance

E-Side 2 debuted at number 42 on the Oricon Combined Albums Chart, and number two on the Digital Albums Chart with 1,904 digital sales. For Billboard Japan, the EP entered the Hot Albums chart at number ten. It earned 1,489 downloads, peaking at number two on the component Download Albums, behind Lisa's album Lander.

Track listing

Charts

Sales

Release history

References

2022 EPs
English-language Japanese albums
Sony Music Entertainment Japan EPs
Yoasobi EPs